
Gmina Opole Lubelskie is an urban-rural gmina (administrative district) in Opole Lubelskie County, Lublin Voivodeship, in eastern Poland.

Villages
Apart from the town of Opole Lubelskie, Gmina Opole Lubelskie contains the villages and settlements of Białowoda, Ćwiętalka, Dąbrowa Godowska, Darowne, Dębiny, Elżbieta, Elżbieta-Kolonia, Emilcin, Górna Owczarnia, Góry Kluczkowickie, Góry Opolskie, Grabówka, Jankowa, Kamionka, Kazimierzów, Kleniewo, Kluczkowice, Kluczkowice-Osiedle, Kręciszówka, Leonin, Ludwików, Majdan Trzebieski, Niezdów, Ożarów Drugi, Ożarów Pierwszy, Puszno Godowskie, Puszno Skokowskie, Rozalin, Ruda Godowska, Ruda Maciejowska, Sewerynówka, Skoków, Stanisławów, Stare Komaszyce, Stary Franciszków, Świdry, Truszków, Trzebiesza, Wandalin, Wola Rudzka, Wólka Komaszycka, Wrzelowiec, Wrzelowiec-Kierzki, Zadole, Zajączków and Zosin.

Neighbouring gminas
Opole Lubelskie is bordered by Chodel, Józefów nad Wisłą, Karczmiska, Łaziska, Poniatowa and Urzędów.

References

Polish official population figures 2006

Opole Lubelskie
Opole Lubelskie County